Cheryl Lynn "Rainbeaux" Smith (June 6, 1955 – October 25, 2002) was an American actress and musician who appeared in a number of mainstream features, exploitation and horror films throughout the 1970s and 1980s. She made her feature debut as lead in the major supernatural horror film Lemora (1973), followed by Caged Heat (1974), Massacre at Central High (1976), and Slumber Party '57 (1976) (Debra Winger's debut film).  She had the title role in Michael Pataki's musical comedy Cinderella (1977).

Career
Smith was born in Los Angeles, California. Her first film appearance was in the short The Birth of Aphrodite after a friend of her mother suggested her for the role.  This led to supporting roles in other films, including the cult classic B-movies Caged Heat, Phantom of the Paradise, The Swinging Cheerleaders, Revenge of the Cheerleaders, The Pom-Pom Girls, The Incredible Melting Man, Laserblast and a cameo role in Cheech and Chong's Up in Smoke.  Perhaps her most striking role in a major release was in a violent bedroom scene opposite a near unknown Sylvester Stallone in the 1975 version of the Philip Marlowe classic Farewell, My Lovely, starring Robert Mitchum. Her starring debut was in the cult-horror film Lemora and her greatest success came as the titular character in Cinderella (1977).

An accomplished musician and artist, Smith was briefly associated with The Runaways during the production of the motion picture We're All Crazy Now, after Sandy West and Lita Ford quit the group in pre-production. An impromptu group was created on the spot, casting Smith through her counsel Stann Findelle and Runaways manager Toby Mamis. The group was fronted by Joan Jett with Smith on the drums as "Sandy".  She briefly continued playing drums for Joan Jett after that band's breakup.

Smith cut an album with a band known as the "L.A. Girls" as the drummer and lead singer. In 1980, Smith was among the performers who collaborated with record producer Jack Nitzsche on the original soundtrack for the William Friedkin film, Cruising. Smith contributed a spoken-word performance of her song, "Sure" for producer and writer Harvey Kubernik's 1982 album, "Voices Of The Angels", which also featured performances by Charles Bukowski and Danny Sugerman.

She was once a Penthouse Pet of the Month. Smith maintained a modeling career and sat for noted photographers Ron Raffaelli and Jan Deen, as well as commercial fashion photographers.

She had a relationship and lived with Glenn Willis, and lived with Ethan Margalith when he founded Starving Students Moving Company. Smith also had relationships with professional musicians Phil Lee, John Sterling (with whom she had a son, Justin), and Brett Smiley.

Death
Cheryl Smith died in the early morning hours on October 25, 2002 of complications from liver disease and hepatitis after being addicted to heroin for two decades.

Discography

Filmography

References

External links

Actresses from Los Angeles
American film actresses
American television actresses
Deaths from hepatitis
1955 births
2002 deaths
Burials at Forest Lawn Memorial Park (Glendale)
American rock drummers
American women drummers
Deaths from liver disease
Infectious disease deaths in California
20th-century American drummers
20th-century American women musicians
20th-century American actresses